Frederick Davey (February 22, 1847 – April 24, 1926) was an English-born political figure in British Columbia. He represented Victoria City in the Legislative Assembly of British Columbia from 1907 to 1916 as a Conservative.

He was born in Truro, Cornwall, and educated in Camborne. In 1890, he married A. Roberts. He served as an alderman for the city of Victoria in 1906. He died in Victoria at the age of 79.

References 

1847 births
1926 deaths
British Columbia Conservative Party MLAs
People from Truro